The 2019 Belgian regional elections took place on Sunday 26 May, the same day as the 2019 European Parliament election as well as the Belgian federal election.

In the regional elections, new representatives were chosen for the Flemish Parliament, Walloon Parliament, Brussels Parliament and the Parliament of the German-speaking Community. The Parliament of the French Community was composed of all elected members of the Walloon Parliament (except German-speaking members) and 19 of the French-speaking members of the Brussels Parliament.

The elections followed the 2014 elections and were shortly after the 2018 local elections, which indicated voters' tendencies after an unusually long period of time without any elections in Belgium.

Electoral system 
The regional parliaments have limited power over their own election; federal law largely regulates this and the federal government organises the elections, which occur per Article 117 of the Constitution on the same day as the European Parliament elections.

As such, all regional parliaments were elected using proportional representation under the D'Hondt method. Only Belgian citizens in Belgium had the right to vote, and voting was mandatory for them. Belgians living abroad were allowed to vote in European and federal elections, but not in regional elections.

The following timetable is fixed for the simultaneous European, federal and regional elections:

Flemish Parliament 

124 members of the Flemish Parliament were elected. The five Flemish provinces (West Flanders, East Flanders, Antwerp, Flemish Brabant and Limburg) each were a constituency, plus the Brussels-Capital Region where those voting for a Dutch-language party could also vote in the Flemish election.

The incumbent Bourgeois Government was made up of a coalition of Flemish nationalists (N-VA), Christian democrats (CD&V) and liberals (Open Vld). The incumbent Minister-President was Geert Bourgeois (N-VA). The three-party centre-right government coalition had a comfortable majority.

In the October 2018 local elections, no major shifts occurred, although N-VA and sp.a lost some support while Vlaams Belang and Groen generally gained votes. CD&V and Open Vld remained stable.

Incumbent Minister-President Bourgois (N-VA) contended in the simultaneous European Parliament elections; N-VA president Bart De Wever (N-VA) was their party's candidate to succeed him as head of the Flemish Government. Minister Hilde Crevits was CD&V's candidate for Minister-President. Open Vld explicitly did not put forward a candidate.

Main candidates 

The following candidates are the first on the respective party list (lijsttrekker) per constituency.

Retiring incumbents 
 Minister Jo Vandeurzen (CD&V, Limburg)
Rob Beenders (sp.a, Limburg)
 Yamila Idrissi (sp.a, Brussels)
Grete Remen (N-VA, Limburg)
 Johan Verstreken (CD&V, West Flanders)

Results

Distribution by province

Walloon Parliament 

75 members of the Walloon Parliament were elected. The members were elected in multi-member arrondissement-based constituencies; the Walloon Parliament is the only parliament in Belgium still using this geographical level for constituencies. A January 2018 law however reduced the constituencies from 13 to 11, following a successful challenge by Ecolo to the Constitutional Court that constituencies with too few seats are unrepresentative. Both Luxembourg constituencies were merged and the Hainaut constituencies were redrawn.

After the 2014 elections, a coalition government of the Socialist Party (PS) and Christian democrats (cdH) was formed. In 2017 however, following major scandals involving mainly PS, cdH opted to continue governing with MR as the main party instead of PS. Willy Borsus (MR) succeeded Paul Magnette (PS) as Minister-President of Wallonia in July 2017. This was the first time a government majority changed during a legislative term of a Belgian regional government.

<noinclude>

Results

Distribution by province

Brussels Parliament 
All 89 members of the Parliament of the Brussels-Capital Region were elected. They were elected at-large, but there were separate Dutch-language party lists (electing 17 members) and French-language party lists (electing 72 members). Those voting for a Dutch-language party could also cast a vote for the Flemish Parliament election.

Results

Distribution by district

German-speaking Community Parliament 
All 25 members of the Parliament of the German-speaking Community were elected in one constituency (at-large).

In the 2014–2019 period, the government was made up of regionalist ProDG, the socialist party and the liberal PFF, headed by Minister-President Oliver Paasch (ProDG).

Results

Distribution by district

Notes

References

External links
 Elections 2019 - Federal Public Service Interior

Regional elections in Belgium
Belgium